San Alberto is a district of the Alto Paraná Department, Paraguay. The city of San Alberto is located in the district. Population is 12060 in 2019. 

San Alberto District